Anilios australis, or the southern blind snake, is a species of snake in the family Typhlopidae. The species is endemic to Australia.

Geographic range
A. australis is found in the following states and territories of Australia: New South Wales, Northern Territory, South Australia, Victoria, and Western Australia.

Reproduction
A. australis is oviparous.

References

Further reading
Boulenger GA (1893). Catalogue of the Snakes in the British Museum (Natural History). Volume I., Containing the Families Typhlopidæ ... London: Trustees of the British Museum (Natural History). (Taylor and Francis, printers). xiii + 448 pp. + Plates I-XXVIII. (Typhlops australis, pp. 35–36).
Gray JE (1845). Catalogue of the Specimens of Lizards in the Collection of the British Museum. London: Trustees of the British Museum. (Edward Newman, printer). xxviii + 289 pp. (Anilios australis, new species, p. 135).

australis
Reptiles described in 1845
Taxa named by John Edward Gray
Snakes of Australia